Albert Bruce Jackson (14 February 1876, in Newbury, Berkshire – 14 January 1947, in Kew) was a British botanist and dendrologist. He worked as an assistant the Royal Botanic Gardens, Kew from 1907 to 1910 and later at the British Museum from 1932 to his death in 1947.

Partial bibliography 

A Handbook of Coniferæ including Ginkgoaceæ with William Dallimore, 1923 

Identification of Conifers, 1946

References

English botanists
English foresters
British dendrologists
1876 births
1947 deaths
Botanists active in Kew Gardens
19th-century British botanists
20th-century British botanists